The Third Army was a Field army of the French Army, which fought during World War I and World War II.

Commanders

World War I
General Ruffey (Mobilization – 30 August 1914)
General Sarrail (30 August 1914 – 22 July 1915)
General Humbert (22 July 1915 – Armistice)

World War II
General Charles-Marie Condé (2 September 1939 – 20 June 1940)

See also 
 3rd Army Corps (France)
 List of French armies in WWI

External links 

 Robert Thibault, 3rd Army, 8th Infantry Division, 12ème Régiment d'Artillerie, 1939-1940

Field armies of France in World War I
03
Military units and formations of France in World War II
Military units and formations established in 1914
1914 establishments in France